X Factor is a Danish television music competition to find new singing talent. Thomas Blachman, Oh Land and Ankerstjerne returned as the judges and Sofie Linde Ingversen returned as the host for the fifth time.

For the first time in the show's history, the number of live shows were cut, from seven weeks to five weeks. This was in light of the show's suspension owing to precautions over the COVID-19 pandemic.

Act Magnus & Aksel withdrew following this suspension due to the latter's academic commitments on the date of the show's intended return.

Alma Agger became the winner of the show.

For the first time ever on the Danish X Factor all 3 constetants from the same category finished in the top 3.

And also Thomas Blachman became the 2nd judge to win the show with all 3 categories and to win 3 seasons in a row.

Judges and hosts
Thomas Blachman returned for the twelfth time as a judge, with Oh Land and Ankerstjerne returning following their debuts last season. Sofie Linde Ingversen returned as the host for the fifth time.

Selection process
Auditions took place in Copenhagen and Aarhus

The 5 Chair Challenge returns for season 13. Blachman will mentor the 15-22s, Oh Land has the Over 23s and Ankerstjerne has the Groups.

The 15 successful acts were:
15-22s: Alma, Emil, Karen Marie, Mathilde, Nichlas
Over 23s: Elina, Ilona, John, Kali, Nicklas
Groups: Da-Noize, Kjurious, Magnus & Aksel, Smokey Eyes, Sway

Bootcamp

The 6 eliminated acts were:
15-22s: Karen Marie, Nichlas
Over 23s: Elina, John
Groups: Da-Noize, Kjurious

Contestants

Key:
 – Winner
 – Runner-up
 – Withdrew

Live shows

Colour key

Contestants' colour key:
{|
|-
| – 15-22s (Blachman's contestants)
|-
| – Over 23s (Oh Land's contestants)
|-
| – Groups (Ankerstjerne's contestants)
|}

Live show details

Week 1 (February 21) 
Theme: Signature

Judges' votes to eliminate
 Oh Land: Mathilde Caffey
 Blachman: Nicklas Mietke
 Ankerstjerne: Nicklas Mietke

Week 2 (February 28) 
Theme: Songs from the 1980s
Musical Guest: Limahl ("The NeverEnding Story")

Judges' votes to eliminate
 Oh Land: Sway
 Ankerstjerne: Kaspar "Kali" Andersen
 Blachman: Sway

Week 3 (March 6) 
Theme: Songs with a message
Musical Guest: Scarlet Pleasure ("Better")

Judges' votes to eliminate
 Ankerstjerne: Kaspar "Kali" Andersen
 Blachman: Ilona Artene
 Oh Land: Kaspar "Kali" Andersen

Week 4: Semi-Final (May 15) 
Theme: Songs from musicals
Musical Guest: Citybois ("Kærlighed Gør Blind")
 Group Performance: ("Can't Stop the Feeling!")

The semi-final did not feature a sing-off and instead the act with the fewest public votes, Ilona Artene, was automatically eliminated.

After Ilona Artene was eliminated she performed "Scared to Be Lonely" by Martin Garrix and Dua Lipa

Magnus & Aksel withdrew from the competition following the show's suspension due to the latter's academic commitments on the date of the show's intended return.

Week 5: Final (May 22/23) 
Theme: Judges Choice, Duet with a Special artist

May 22

Theme:  Winner's song
Musical guest: Lukas Graham ("Love Songs")
Group performance: "Hun Kommer Tilbage" (Jung performed by auditionees), "Memories" (Maroon 5 performed by The 9 Contestants)

May 23

The Audionees did not performed on stage they performed at home via video because of Coronavirus.

Sofie Linde only announced the winner but after the voting stats for the final came out it was revealed that Mathilde Caffey became the runner-up and Emil Wismann came in 3rd place.

References

Season 13
2020 Danish television seasons
The X Factor seasons
Television productions suspended due to the COVID-19 pandemic